The 1913–14 Gold Cup was the 2nd edition of the Gold Cup, a cup competition in Irish football. It was the first staging of the competition under the name of the Gold Cup - the previous edition in 1911–12 was played under the name of the New Irish Cup.

The tournament was won by Distillery for the first time, defeating Shelbourne 3–2 in the final replay at Grosvenor Park, after the original final match ended in a 0–0 draw at Dalymount Park.

Results

Quarter-finals

|}

Semi-finals

|}

Final

Replay

References

1913–14 in Irish association football